DQA may refer to:

 Data Quality Act, US
 Daqing Sartu Airport (IATA code), China
 Maldivian (airline) (ICAO code), the Maldives
 Island Aviation Services (ICAO code), the parent company; See List of airline codes
 Data Query Assistant, in Lotus DataLens